1993 Nagoya Grampus Eight season

Review and events

League results summary

League results by round

Competitions

Domestic results

J.League

Suntory series

NICOS series

Emperor's Cup

J.League Cup

Player statistics

 † player(s) joined the team after the opening of this season.

Transfers

In:

Out:

Transfers during the season

In
Elivélton (from São Paulo FC on October)

Out
Pita (on October)

Notes

References

Other pages
 J. League official site
 Nagoya Grampus official site

Nagoya Grampus Eight
Nagoya Grampus seasons